Michael Donovan is a Canadian voice actor and director.

Roles

Animation

 3-2-1 Penguins!Kevin
 A Chinese Ghost Story: The Tsui Hark AnimationNing
 Action DadChuck Ramsey, Slam McJackson, Ms. Poundpenny, additional voices
 Action ManNarrator
 Adventures from the Book of VirtuesSock, Socrates, additional voices
 Adventures of Sonic the HedgehogWes Weasley, Mad Mike
 Animated Classic ShowcaseGuest voices
 Batman: Gotham KnightsGun Runner #3
 Batman: The Animated SeriesGuest voices
 Billy the CatMr. Hubert, Magician, Blackie, additional voices
 Boom Boom SabotageTV Narrator/Commercial VO
 Bumble BraynesBurwin
 Camp CandyGrannie Knot, various guest roles
 Captain N: The Game MasterEggplant Wizard, additional voices
 Captain Zed and the Zee ZoneGuest voices
 Coconut Fred's Fruit Salad IslandMr. Greenrind, additional voices
 Conan the AdventurerConan
 Conan and the Young Warriors Graak
 Class of the Titans Pritihous (Ep.41) Recipe for Disaster
 Cramp TwinsGuest voices
 CybillBurglar Alarm
 Detective DogIris Cop Potato
 Dragon BoosterGuest voices
 Edgar & EllenVarious voices
 El MariachiBones, additional voices
 Exo SquadWolf Bronsky, additional voices
 Fat Dog MendozaGuest voices
 The Fearless Four (film)The Heir / The Host / Guard #3
 Firehouse TalesAdditional Voices
 Funky FablesVarious voices
 G.I. Joe: A Real American HeroBig Bear, Cloudburst
 Generation O!Billy Bob 'Large-Mouth' Bass
 Geronimo StiltonGuest role
 Green Legend RanVarious voices
 Goodtimes Fairy TalesVarious voices
 Handy MannyHank
 He-Man and the Masters of the UniverseRandor, Count Marzo and other additional voices
 Heroes on Hot WheelsMichael Valiant, Quincy, Fox, additional voices
 Hey Arnold!Guest Voices
 Hot Wheels: World RaceDr. Peter Tezla
 Hot Wheels: AcceleRacersDr. Peter Tezla, additional voices
 HurricanesGuest voices
 Investi-GatorInvesti-Gator
 Jay Jay the Jet PlaneBig Jake, Old Oscar, Narrator (seasons 3-4, as C.W. Walken)
 Jingle Bell RockGuest voices
 JLA Adventures: Trapped in TimeBizarro
 King Arthur and the Knights of JusticeSir Darren, Sir Lug, Warlord Hammer, Football announcer
 Kishin Corps: Alien Defender Geo-ArmorKimihiko Masumi
 Kong: The Animated SeriesGuest voices
 LeapFrog: Talking Word FactoryWho's Your Best Dad? Weasel Host
 Lego Star Wars: The Freemaker AdventuresObi-Wan Kenobi, TIE Fighter Pilot, Salesman
 Lego Star Wars: The Yoda ChroniclesObi-Wan Kenobi
 Lego Star Wars: Droid TalesObi-Wan Kenobi
 Leo the Lion: King of the JungleNarrator
 Lil' BushTiny, Ride Master
 Littlest Pet ShopStu the Dog, Slick the Bug, Pet, A Pig
 MadelineConductor, additional voices
 Maison IkkokuZenzaburo Mitsukoshi
 Make Way For NoddyNarrator
 Martin MysteryGuest voices
 Mega ManRing Man, X
 Molly O!Guest Voices
 ¡Mucha Lucha!El Rey, Old Man, Megawatt, Sonic Sumo
 ¡Mucha Lucha!: The Return of El Maléfico El Rey, Groom, Botas Del Fuego, Megawatt
 Mummies Alive!Guest voices
 NASCAR RacersGuest voices
 Nowhere ManSecurity Guard
 PollyWorldJohn
 Rocket PowerGuest voices
 ReBootPhong, Mike the TV, Cecil, Al
 RugratsGuest voices
 Sergeant SavageMouse, Soldier
 Shadow RaidersGuest Voices
 Skysurfer Strike ForceSkysurfer One, Noxious, additional voices
 Sonic UndergroundGuest Voices
 Sorcerers of the Magic KingdomLawrence
 Space StrikersNed Land
 Spider-Man UnlimitedCarnage
 Spiff and HerculesVarious
 Stark RavenVarious voices
 Street FighterGuile, Zangief
 Superman: The Animated SeriesGuest voices
 Sylvester and Tweety MysteriesGuest voices
 Team GalaxyVarious voices
 The Adventures of T-RexShooter, Professor, additional voices
 The Adventures of Captain Zoom in Outer SpaceAnnouncer
 The Adventures of Chico and GuapoMr. Angelo
 The Bots MasterGeneSix, Cook
 The Chimp ChannelBif, additional voices
 The Fearless FourThe Heir, The Host, Guard #3
 The Incredible HulkGrey Hulk
 The Legend of KorraMayor (Ep. 28)
 The MagicianAce Cooper/The Magician, DJ Mikkis, Inspector/Senator Dobbs
 The Magic Trolls and the Troll WarriorsSven, Guard, Oddvar
 The New Adventures of He-ManGeneral Nifel, additional voices
 The New Adventures of Little TootSalty the Pelican, Charlie
 The Secret Files of the Spy DogsAgent Stahl, additional voices
 The Twisted Tales of Felix the CatGuest voices
 Tom and Jerry TalesSpike, Droopy Dog (season 2 only), additional voices
 Video PowerKuros, Doug Simmons, additional voices
 Vor-Tech: Undercover Conversion SquadShepherd (Hudson Rourke)
 Walter Melonadditional voices
 Winx Club Rick, additional voices
 Xiaolin Chronicles Dojo Kanojo Cho, Master Fung 
 X-Men: EvolutionSabretooth
 Zak TalesZak, Kilroy

Live-action
 Star Wars: The Force Awakens additional characters (voice only)

Anime
Dragon BallMaster Roshi
Dragon Ball: Curse of the Blood RubiesPenny's father, Master Roshi
Dragon Warrior - Adonis
Fate/ZeroZouken Mato, Glen McKenzie
HarmagedonAsanshi
InuyashaSuikotsu
Magic☆Hospital! - Dr. Kory Bodily
Marvel Anime: Iron ManVarious voices
Mobile Suit Gundam SEED DestinyJoachim Ruddle
Ōban Star-RacersAikka's fencing instructor, additional voices
Ranma ½Ryoga Hibiki, Jusenkyo Guide (Seasons 6-7)
Ronin WarriorsCye Mouri, Sage Date
Transformers: CybertronDirt Boss, Crosswise, Primus

Video games
Cabela's Dangerous Hunts 2011Announcer, Hiker, Scientist
Cars 2Additional voices
Captain America: Super SoldierIron Cross, additional voices
Dungeons and Dragons OnlineDungeon Master, various others
Final Fantasy XIII-2Principal character
HulkGrey Hulk
Guild Wars 2Malyck
The Incredible Hulk: Ultimate DestructionGrey Hulk
Resident Evil 6President Adam Benford
Skylanders: SuperChargersAdditional voices
Skylanders: Trap TeamAdditional voices
The Elder Scrolls V: SkyrimKodlak Whitemane, Malacath
WarhammerVarious voices
World of Warcraft - Shade of Xavius, Xavius, Locus-walker, various voices

Directing and casting credits
Lego Star Wars: The Freemaker AdventuresDisney / Lucasfilm / WilFilm
Lego Nexo Knights - Lego / M2
Lego Elves - Lego / JaFilm
Lego Star Wars - Lego / WilFilm
Lego Friends - Lego / M2
Lego Ninjago: Masters of SpinjitzuLego/WilFilm
Hydee and the Hytops: The MovieSD Entertainment, Maslen Entertainment
NinjagoNew Lego MovieWilFilm/Feelgoodfilm, Denmark
Superbook36 episodesCBN
Dreamkix26 episodesDesignstorm
Rollbots26 episodes4 Kids/Amberwood Animation
321 Penguins26 episodesNBC Kubo/Big Idea Productions
A Kind of Magic26 episodesXilam Animation
Care Bearsthe Series26 episodesCBS/American Greeting/SD Ent.
Care Bears: Oopsy Does It!Feature filmAmerican Greeting/SD Ent.
Care Bears: Star Glo AdventuresFeature filmAmerican Greeting/SD Ent.
Care Bears6 direct-to-video moviesAmerican Greeting/SD Ent.
Famous 5: On the Case26 episodesDisney Channel/Marathon/Chorion
Eon Kid26 episodesWarner Brothers
Oban Star Racers 26 episodesJetix/Disney/Sav Productions
Monster Buster Club 52 episodesJetix/Toon Disney/Marathon
Tom and Jerry Tales 78 episodesWarner Brothers
Tom and Jerry: A Nutcracker TaleDirect-to-video movie- Warner Brothers/Turner Entertainment
Coconut Fred's Fruit Salad Island26 episodesWarner Brothers
Goodtimes Fairy TalesGoodtimes Entertainment/Jetlag Productions/Carye Brothers
Team Galaxy52 episodesMarathon Animation
Alien Racers52 episodesMGA/SD Entertainment
He-Man and the Masters of the Universe39 episodesMattel/Mike Young Productions
Nilus the Sandman26 episodesDelaney & Friends Cartoon Prod./Cambium Film & Video Productions
Martin Mystery66 episodesYTV/Marathon Animation
ReBoot47 episodesABC/Alliance/Mainframe Entertainment
Action Man26 episodesFox/MGM/SD Ent/Mainframe
Make Way for Noddy100 episodesChorion Ent./SD Entertainment
The Book of Virtues13 episodesPBS/Porchlight Entertainment
Skysurfer Strike Force26 episodesRuby Spears/Ashi Prod. Co./Bohbot
War Planets (Shadow Raiders)40 episodesMainframe Entertainment
Bratz Babies (The Movie)MGA/SD Entertainment
Spiff and Hercules52 episodeTFI/Col.Ima.Son/Channel 4 (UK)/Ocean
Tony Hawk in Boom Boom SabotageDirect-to-videoFunimation/Mainframe Ent.
Dragon BallFunimation/Seagull/Trimark (1995 dub)
Dragon Ball: Curse of the Blood RubiesDirect-to-video-Funimation/Trimark
Max Steel6 direct-to-video moviesMattel/Mainframe Ent.
CandylandDirect-to-video movieHasbro/SD Entertainment
My Little Pony: A Very Pony Place)DTVHasbro/SD Entertainment
My Little Pony: Twinkle Wish AdventureDTVHasbro/SD Entertainment 
My Little Pony: LIVEDTVHasbro/SD Entertainment
Hot Wheels: Highway 35World RaceMattel/Mainframe Entertainment
Hot Wheels: AcceleRacersIgnitionMattel/Mainframe Entertainment
Hot Wheels: AcceleRacersThe Speed of SilenceMattel/Mainframe Entertainment
Hot Wheels: AcceleRacersBreaking PointMattel/Mainframe Entertainment
Hot Wheels: AcceleRacersThe Ultimate RaceMattel/Mainframe Entertainment
Scary GodmotherDTVMainframe Entertainment
Lapitch the Little ShoemakerCroatia Film/HaffaDiebold/Pro 7
Billy the Cat52 episodes, 2 specialsOcean Group/EVA Entertainment/NOA/WIC/Siriol Productions
Sugar and SpiceFuji Project Ltd/Saban Entertainment
GeoTrax – "New Train in Town"DTVFisher Price
GeoTrax – "Legend of Old Rust"DTVFisher Price
GeoTrax – "Flying Lesson"DTVFisher Price
The Adventures of T-Rex52 episodesGunther/Wahl/Jetlag Productions
King Arthur and the Knights of Justice26 episodesJetlag Productions
Heavy Metal 2000Feature filmColumbia Tristar/CinéGroupe
The Fearless FourFeature filmWarner Brothers/Munich Animation
Help! I'm a Fish!Feature filmA Film/Munich Animation
Jester TillFeature filmWarner Brothers/Munich Animation

References

External links

Canadian male voice actors
Canadian casting directors
Canadian voice directors
Living people
Canadian expatriates in the United States
Canadian impressionists (entertainers)
20th-century Canadian male actors
21st-century Canadian male actors
Year of birth missing (living people)
Place of birth missing (living people)